Epirrita pulchraria, the whitelined looper, is a species of geometrid moth in the family Geometridae.

The MONA or Hodges number for Epirrita pulchraria is 7435.

References

Further reading

 
 

Epirrita
Articles created by Qbugbot
Moths described in 1907